Allan Smith is a multiple British champion and Team GB internationalist high jumper. He first came to the attention of the athletics world in 2011 when capturing all the Great Britain & Ireland Under 20 Men national indoor championship titles in a unique domestic athletics "grand-slam" that had never been done before. During that indoor season he also won the Welsh senior indoor title and set a Championship Best Performance in the Scottish Athletics Indoor League, placing him at the top of the UK junior men rankings for 2011.

In 2012, he won the Scottish National Open and was runner-up in the Amateur Athletic Association of England (AAA) Under 23 Championship.

During the 2013 indoor season Smith won the Scottish Universities title, Scottish Seniors title and was runner up in the UK Senior Indoor Championships. During the outdoor season Allan won a bronze medal at the European U23 Athletics Championships in Tampere, Finland, clearing a personal best height of 2.26m. At the end of the 2013 season Smith received the "Scottish Sports Aid Junior Sportsperson of the Year Award 2013".
 
In 2014 he won both England Athletics U23 and British Athletics Senior high jump championship titles. In February 2015 he continued his domestic winning streak by capturing the Scottish Athletics indoor title and then followed it up by winning the British Athletics Indoor title with a new pb of 2.29m.

During his career Smith has accumulated many high jump records at various levels; including the Scottish Native Record; Scottish Universities and Colleges; Scottish Schools; Scottish Athletics Indoor League, Scottish Athletics Under 20 Men and the Shaftesbury Barnet club record. Of particular note is the Scottish Native Record of 2.22m which he set in January 2013 whilst competing at the Scottish Universities and College Championships in Glasgow. Two weeks later he raised the Scottish native record to 2.23m, a mark set at the British International Match in Glasgow as he represented the Commonwealth Select team.

In 2017 Allan was selected to represent Great Britain at the European Indoor Championships and the World University Games; and by Scotland for the Loughborough and Manchester Internationals. In 2018, Smith jumped 2.27m at the Commonwealth Games in Australia, narrowly missing a medal and finishing 5th overall. He also won the BUCS outdoor high jump title as a first time participant. In 2019, he won both the Scottish and British Athletics national championships for men's high jump.

In May 2021 he announced his retirement.

Achievements

References

External links

1992 births
Living people
Sportspeople from Paisley, Renfrewshire
Scottish male high jumpers
British male high jumpers
Commonwealth Games competitors for Scotland
Athletes (track and field) at the 2018 Commonwealth Games
British Athletics Championships winners